Naṟṟiṇai ( meaning excellent tinai), is a classical Tamil poetic work and traditionally the first of the Eight Anthologies (Ettuthokai) in the Sangam literature. The collection – sometimes spelled as Natrinai or Narrinai – contains both akam (love) and puram (war, public life) category of poems. The Naṟṟiṇai anthology contains 400 poems, mainly of 9 to 12 lines, but a few with 8 to 13 lines each. According to Takanobu Takahashi – a Tamil literature scholar, the Naṟṟiṇai poems were likely composed between 100–300 CE based on the linguistics, style and dating of the authors. While Kamil Zvelebil – a Tamil literature and history scholar , dates some poems to the 1st century BCE. The Naṟṟiṇai manuscript colophon states that it was compiled under the patronage of the Pandyan king named Pannatu Tanta Pantiyan Maran Valuti, but the compiler remained anonymous. 

The Naṟṟiṇai poems are credited to 175 ancient poets. Two of these poems are attributed to the patron king. According to Kamil Zvelebil – this poetic anthology contains a few Sanskrit loan words and contains 59 allusions to historical events. Many lines from these poems were borrowed into later Tamil works such as the famed post-Sangam Tamil works: Tirukkural, Silappatikaram and Manimekalai. The Tamil legend about Kannagi (Kannaki), one who tore of her breast to protest against her husband's unjust execution, appears in Naṟṟiṇai 312.

Translations
The text has been translated by A. Dakshinamurthy and published by the International Institute of Tamil Studies, Chennai in the year 2000.

References

Bibliography
 Mudaliyar, Singaravelu A., Apithana Cintamani, An encyclopaedia of Tamil Literature, (1931) - Reprinted by Asian Educational Services, New Delhi (1983)
 

Sangam literature